Trance is a 2013 psychological thriller film directed by Danny Boyle with a screenplay by Joe Ahearne and John Hodge from a story by Ahearne. It stars James McAvoy, Vincent Cassel, and Rosario Dawson. The world premiere of the film was held in London on 19 March 2013.

Plot
Four men attack an auction house during the auction of Francisco Goya's Witches in the Air (1798). Simon Newton (McAvoy), one of the auctioneers, follows the house's emergency protocol by quickly removing the painting from the auction floor and packaging it for deposit in a vault, but Franck (Cassel), the leader of the thieves, finds him and takes the package at gunpoint. Simon attacks Franck, who hits Simon on the head and knocks him unconscious. When Franck gets home, he discovers that the package contains only an empty frame. The thieves are unable to find the painting in Simon's apartment or car, so, after he is released from the hospital, they kidnap and torture him. It becomes clear that Simon was involved in the heist as an "inside man" and double-crossed the other thieves, but the blow to the head has left him with a case of amnesia, and he does not remember where he hid the painting. Franck decides to send Simon to a hypnotherapist to try to help him remember.

Simon chooses Elizabeth Lamb (Dawson) from a list of hypnotherapists. Using a fake name, he tells her he is looking for some lost keys, hoping he can secretly get her to lead him to the painting instead. While he is in a hypnotic trance, Simon gives Elizabeth his real name as the name of an alter ego who will help them find the keys, and she notices Simon's injuries from being tortured and sees a wire sticking out from under his shirt from the covert listening device he is wearing so the other thieves can hear what he says during the session. When there are only keys in the location Elizabeth helps Simon remember, Franck sends Simon back to Elizabeth. By their second session, she has researched Simon and the theft, and she starts by silently asking him if he is in trouble. When he says he is, she says she can help and tells the other thieves she needs to talk to them.

In exchange for a cut of the proceeds from the sale of the painting, Elizabeth hypnotizes Simon again, this time with the other thieves present, but she is unable to get him to remember the location of the painting. Afterward, she asks him how he got involved with Franck, and Simon confesses that he has a gambling problem and convinced Franck to settle his debts in exchange for help stealing the painting.

During the next hypnosis session, Simon remembers that, before encountering Franck during the heist, he had cut the painting from the frame and hid it in his suit, and he attacked Franck because Franck was about to look at the painting. Shortly after the blow to his head, he awoke alone and left the auction house. While crossing the street, he was distracted by a text message on his phone and got hit by a red car. He remembers the driver as having been Elizabeth, who he accuses of making him forget something before lunging at her, in the memory as well as in real life. The other thieves restrain Simon, and Elizabeth brings him out of the trance.

The next morning, Simon wakes up to find that Elizabeth has slept on his couch because she was worried about him. He says he had a strange dream, which she says was not a dream, in which she and Franck put him in a fMRI and ran a test that indicated he has an obsession with her. Elizabeth explains to Franck that this is due to transference and Simon's attempts to fill the gaps in his memory from the brain trauma, but she can use it to seduce Simon and get him to tell her where the painting is. When Simon apologizes to Elizabeth, she acts understanding and agrees to go to out with him.

At dinner, Simon abruptly cools toward Elizabeth and goes home. She tells Franck this happened because Simon is jealous of him, and Franck and Elizabeth argue and then have sex. One of the other thieves sees this and tells Simon, who is waiting for Elizabeth when she gets home. She is able to trigger his lust for her to calm his jealousy, and then surreptitiously hypnotizes him. By leading Simon through an imagined narrative in which Franck is planning to kill him, Elizabeth is finally able to get Simon to reveal to her where he hid the painting, but she is caught by the other thieves when she leaves to go retrieve it. Simon and Franck are sent to get the painting, while the other thieves stay behind in Elizabeth's apartment to rape her. Franck is distracted by her screams as the thieves draw closer to her, and Simon overpowers Franck and kills the other three thieves.

Elizabeth convinces Simon to spare Franck and bring him with them to get the painting. The trio go to a parking garage and collect a red car, which they drive to a warehouse. During the trip, Elizabeth reveals that Simon had previously come to her for help with his gambling addiction. They started an affair, but he became obsessed with her, jealous, and, eventually, abusive. Fearing for her life, she re-directed the hypnosis to make him forget her. Unfortunately, when Franck hit Simon on the head, it brought back a vague sense of his memories of Elizabeth, and, in his confused state, he imagined the driver of the car who hit him as Elizabeth and strangled the woman to death.

At the warehouse, Elizabeth finds the painting and the body of the driver in the trunk of the car. Simon gives Elizabeth the painting and then douses the car in fuel. Because Franck is still zip-tied to the steering wheel, Elizabeth begs Simon to not set the car on fire, but to no avail. While the fuel ignites and Franck struggles to free himself, Elizabeth runs away. She returns in a truck, which she drives into Simon, pinning him against the car. Both Simon and the car in which Franck is trapped are pushed through the wall of the warehouse and into a river. Franck manages to escape, and it is implied that Simon is killed. Elizabeth makes sure Franck is alright before she disappears.

Sometime later, Franck is swimming in his apartment while thinking of Elizabeth. A package is delivered, and inside he finds an iPad that contains a video of Elizabeth, who has the painting hanging on the wall behind her. She reveals that, when she hypnotized Simon to make him forget her, she also hypnotized him to steal a painting for her to pay her back for his abuse, which is why Simon broke his agreement with Franck, and it is shown that the text message Simon received before being hit by the car was from Elizabeth and told him to deliver the painting to her. Elizabeth tells Franck that he can try to find her and recover the painting, or he can open an app on the iPad called "Trance", and a recording of her voice will erase her and the whole ordeal from his memory–the choice to remember or forget is his. Franck is shown debating whether to press the button as the screen cuts to black.

Cast

 James McAvoy as Simon Newton
 Vincent Cassel as Franck
 Rosario Dawson as Elizabeth Lamb
 Danny Sapani as Nate
 Matt Cross as Dominic
 Wahab Sheikh as Riz
 Mark Poltimore (7th Baron Poltimore) as Francis Lemaitre
 Tuppence Middleton as Young Woman in Red Car
 Simon Kunz as Surgeon
 Michael Shaeffer as Security Guard #1
 Tony Jayawardena as Security Guard #2
 Vincent Montuel as Handsome Waiter
 Jai Rajani as Car Park Attendant
 Spencer Wilding as 60's Robber
 Gursharan Chaggar as Postman
 Edward Rising as 60's Auctioneer

Production

Development
After director Danny Boyle filmed Shallow Grave in 1994, Joe Ahearne sent the director his screenplay for Trance, seeking Boyle's encouragement. Boyle thought the project would be "quite difficult" for a beginning screenwriter. Ahearne later turned the script into a 2001 British television movie. Boyle never forgot it, and, almost two decades after their original conversation, he contacted Ahearne about turning it into a feature film. Partially based on Ahearne's television film of the same name, Trance underwent script doctoring by screenwriter John Hodge, marking the fifth motion picture collaboration between Hodge and Boyle.

Casting
In May 2011, Michael Fassbender was cast as Franck, but he later dropped out due to scheduling conflicts. Colin Firth was considered for the part before Cassel was cast. Scarlett Johansson, Melanie Thierry, and Zoe Saldana were considered for the role that went to Dawson.

McAvoy, who accepted his role in 2011, said that, while reading the script, he almost turned down the part because Simon seemed to be a victim, which didn't interest him. He told NPR's reporter Laura Sullivan: "And then I got about 15 or 20 pages in, and I started to sense that something else was coming in the character. And then something else did come. And then about every 10 pages, something else came. Until at the end, I was hungry to play this part."

Filming
Principal photography for the film began in September 2011. After filming wrapped up, the film was placed on hold in order for Boyle to work on the opening ceremony of the 2012 Summer Olympics in London. Post-production was then picked up again in August 2012.

Boyle said that this is "the first time I put a woman at the heart of a movie." He also said that he originally intended to set the movie in New York City, but it was filmed in London and in Kent instead, as Boyle's Olympic ceremony duties meant he had to stay in the United Kingdom.

Music
On 4 January 2013, it was announced that Rick Smith of the band Underworld would be composing the music for the film. Underworld previously contributed tracks to other Danny Boyle films, including Trainspotting (1996), A Life Less Ordinary (1997), The Beach (2000), and Sunshine (2007). About the collaboration, Smith said: "After finishing the Opening Ceremony, I hardly knew what day of the week it was. I took a month off work, off music, off everything. Exactly one month and three days after we said goodbye in the stadium, I received a text from Danny that said, 'Do you ever want to hear from me again workwise and would that go as far as having a chat about Trance... Questions, questions.' Two Minutes later I was on board."

When asked by an interviewer about the secret of his 17-year-old creative partnership with Smith, Boyle joked, "He's cheap." Then, answering seriously, he said that they both like electronic music and that he doesn't prescribe a sound for a scene, but lets Smith follow his own instincts.

The soundtrack album for Trance was released in the United Kingdom on 25 March 2013 and in the United States on 2 April.

Release
Boyle showed a teaser trailer for the film and an extended version of an alternate ending at South by Southwest on 9 March 2013. The entire film could not be screened at the festival, as is usually done, because the producing studio Pathé owned the rights to the world premiere, which was held in London on 19 March 2013. The film saw general release in the United Kingdom on 27 March 2013 and in the United States on 5 April.

Reception
The film received mostly positive reviews from critics. On Rotten Tomatoes, it has a score of 68% based on reviews from 160 critics; the site's consensus is: "As stylish as ever, director Danny Boyle seems to be treading water with the surprisingly thinly written Trance -- but for fans of Boyle's work, it should still prove a trippily entertaining distraction". On Metacritic, which assigns a weighted mean rating out of 100 based on reviews from film critics, the film has a score of 61% based on 37 reviews.

In its review, Empire magazine gave the film 4 out of 5 stars and called it "a dazzling, absorbing entertainment which shows off Danny Boyle's mastery of complex storytelling and black, black humour." Empire also ranked the film #27 in its top 50 films of 2013.

Washington Post writer Michael O'Sullivan described Boyle as "playing fast and loose with reality."

References

External links
 
 
 
 
 

2013 films
2013 crime drama films
2013 psychological thriller films
British crime drama films
British crime thriller films
British mystery films
Films directed by Danny Boyle
Films set in apartment buildings
Films shot in Kent
Films shot in London
British neo-noir films
TSG Entertainment films
Film4 Productions films
Pathé films
British nonlinear narrative films
Films with screenplays by John Hodge
Films about amnesia
Films about hypnosis
Indian Paintbrush (production company) films
Cultural depictions of Francisco Goya
2010s English-language films
2010s British films